Redheads on Parade is a 1935 American musical film directed by Norman Z. McLeod and written by Don Hartman and Rian James. The film stars John Boles, Dixie Lee, Jack Haley, Raymond Walburn, Alan Dinehart and Patsy O'Connor. The film was released on August 30, 1935, by 20th Century Fox and produced by Fox Film Corporation.

Plot
George Magnus, John Bruce and their publicity agent, Peter Mathews, attempt to make a new picture, Beauties on Parade , but halfway through filming, their backer goes bankrupt.

Cast 
John Boles as John Bruce
Dixie Lee as Ginger Blair
Jack Haley as Peter Mathews
Raymond Walburn as Augustus Twill
Alan Dinehart as George Magnus
Patsy O'Connor as Patsy Blair
Herman Bing as Lionel Kunkel
William Austin as Trelawney Redfern
Wilbur Mack as Henry Johnson

Reviews
"Hardly living up to the excellence of its title and exploitation possibilities, ‘Redheads on Parade’ is relegated to subsequent-run assignments by its weak and unexciting story. . . Interwoven with this is the love story affecting Boles and Dixie Lee, extremely muddled and placing Mrs. Bing almost solely in the role of a good listener except for a couple of songs. . . Picture doesn’t contain an outstanding performance or moment, though each member of the cast contributes his best."

References

External links 
 

1935 films
20th Century Fox films
American musical films
1935 musical films
Films directed by Norman Z. McLeod
American black-and-white films
Fox Film films
1930s English-language films
1930s American films